Mostostal is a steel construction group of companies based in Warsaw, Poland. It is now part of one of the largest industrial conglomerate companies in Poland.

The company fabricates and builds a wide range of steel industrial structures. Projects have included chemical plants and radio masts.

History
The company was formed in 1945 in Kraków, but a short time after moved its headquarters to Zabrze, then to Warsaw.

In the 1970s, the company built the radio mast in Konstantynów, which was the tallest structure on Earth until its collapse in 1991.

See also

References

Steel companies of Poland
Polish brands
Construction and civil engineering companies of Poland
Companies based in Warsaw
Conglomerate companies of Poland
Conglomerate companies established in 1945
Construction and civil engineering companies established in 1945
Manufacturing companies established in 1945
1945 establishments in Poland